Spec Ops is a series of tactical shooter video games. The first two games were developed by Zombie Studios, while Runecraft assisted development on the next three games, and the sixth game in 2002 developed by Big Grub.

The first two games were published by Ripcord Games, with the following three published by Take-Two Interactive, and the sixth game in 2002 published by Gotham Games.

The series was revived 10 years later in 2012 as a third-person cover shooter with Yager Development taking over development and 2K Games taking over publishing.

History
It was decided to make Spec Ops into an ongoing franchise while the first game, Spec Ops: Rangers Lead the Way, was still in development. Executive producer Mike Suarez reasoned that the audience for simulation fans "is very loyal; they buy six to twelve products in every year. It's a real evergreen business if you can launch a successful franchise in the simulations category."

Between 1999 and 2002, the games Stealth Patrol, Ranger Elite, Covert Assault, and Airborne Commando came out for the first PlayStation and the PlayStation Portable. These featured combat settings and tactical gameplay resembling contemporary titles like SOCOM U.S. Navy SEALs and Rainbow Six.

Spec Ops: The Line (2012) rebooted the Spec Ops series as a third person cover shooter with arcade style gameplay. It received highly positive reviews from critics and has since gained a substantial cult following, particularly for its dark story that explores the morality and psychological consequences of war and the shooter genre itself. However, The Line was a commercial failure, leading to the announcement that there would be no sequel to the game, effectively ending the series.

Games
Spec Ops: Rangers Lead the Way (1998) (Windows PC)
Spec Ops: Ranger Team Bravo (1998)
Spec Ops II: Green Berets (1999) (Windows)
Spec Ops II: Operation Bravo (2000)
Spec Ops II: Omega Squad (1999) (Windows/Dreamcast)
Spec Ops: Stealth Patrol (2000) (PlayStation)
Spec Ops: Ranger Elite (2001) (PlayStation)
Spec Ops: Covert Assault (2001) (PlayStation)
Spec Ops: Airborne Commando (2002) (PlayStation)
Spec Ops: The Line (2012) (PC, PS3, Xbox 360)

References

External links

2K Games franchises
Take-Two Interactive franchises
Video game franchises
Video game franchises introduced in 1998